Laidi Palace is a palace in Laidi parish in Kuldīga municipality in the historical region of Courland, in western Latvia. Built in the early 19th century, it has housed the Laidi primary school since 1921.

See also
List of palaces and manor houses in Latvia

References

External links
  Laidi Palace
 

Palaces in Latvia
Kuldīga Municipality